The Green Room Award for Female Actor in a Leading Role (Music Theatre) is an annual award recognising excellence in the performing arts in Melbourne, Australia. The peer-based Green Room Awards were first presented in February 1984, for productions in 1983.

Winners and nominees
Winners are in bold; nominees are provided when all nominees in that year are known.

1980s

1990s

2000s

2010s

See also
 Green Room Award for Male Actor in a Leading Role (Music Theatre)
 Green Room Award for Female Actor in a Featured Role (Music Theatre)
 Green Room Award for Male Actor in a Featured Role (Music Theatre)

References
Notes

Citations

External links
Green Room Awards Association website

Green Room Awards